Malena Grisel Alterio Bacaicoa (born 21 January 1974) is an Argentine-born Spanish actress. She became well known with the Spanish TV series Aquí no hay quien viva, playing the role of Belén López Vázquez.

Movies 

 Espejo, espejo (2022)
 Bajo el mismo techo (2019)
Perdiendo el Norte (2015)
Cinco metros cuadrados(2011) .... co-starred with Fernando Tejero Virginia
Al final del camino (2008)  ... Pilar
Una palabra tuya, with Esperanza Pedreño (2008) .... Rosario
Marta
Casual Day (2007) .... Bea
Días de cine, directed by David Serrano (2006) .... Gloria
Miguel y William, directed by Inés París (2007) .... Magdalena
Semen, una historia de amor, directed by Inés París and Daniela Fejerman (2005)
Entre nosotros (2005) .... Patricia
Las voces de la noche, directed by Salvador García Ruiz (2003) .... Julia
Torremolinos 73, directed by Pablo Berger (2003) .... Vanessa
Cásate conmigo, Maribel(2002) .... Nini
El Balancín de Iván (2002) .... Eva
Mezclar es malísimo(2001) .... Julia
El palo, directed by Eva Lesmes (2001) .... Violeta "Pecholata"

Series 
Señoras del (h)AMPA (2019) (13 episodes)..... Lourdes Sanguino
 Vergüenza (2017–20) ..... Nuria.
BuenAgente (2011) (19 episodes)..... Lola
La que se avecina (2007) (13 episodes)..... Cristina Aguilera
Aquí no hay quien viva (2003–06) (90 episodes) ..... Belén López Vázquez
El Comisario (2003) (5 episodes) ..... Agente Lorena
Hermanas (1998) (1 episode) ..... Isabel

Theatre 
Charitys (1996), collective direction
Musicantes (1996), directed by Daniel Lovecchio
Náufragos (1997), directed by María Boto and Jesús Amate
Lorca al rojo vivo (1998), directed by Cristina Rota
La barraca (1998), directed by Cristina Rota
Encierro (1999), directed by Andrés Lima
La pastelera (1999), directed by Malena Alterio
El obedecedor (2000), directed by Amparo Valle
Rulos (2001), directed by Fernando Soto
Uncle Vanya (2008)

Prizes

Premios Goya

Unión de Actores

Fotogramas de Plata

Premios ATV

Festival Internacional de Cine Independiente de Ourense

References

External links

1974 births
Living people
Argentine emigrants to Spain
20th-century Spanish actresses
21st-century Spanish actresses
Actresses from Buenos Aires
Argentine people of Italian descent